Midland is a city in and the county seat of Midland County, Michigan. The city's population was 42,547 as of the 2020 census. It is the principal city of the Midland Micropolitan Statistical Area, part of the larger Saginaw-Midland-Bay City Combined Statistical Area.

History
By the late 1820s, Midland was established as a fur trading post of the American Fur Company supervised by the post at Saginaw. Here agents purchased furs from Ojibwe trappers. The Campau family of Detroit operated an independent trading post at this location in the late 1820s.

Dow Chemical Company was founded in Midland in 1897, and its world headquarters are still located there. Through the influence of a Dow Chemical plant opening in Handa, Aichi, Japan, Midland and Handa have become sister cities. Dow Corning was also headquartered in Midland.

In 1969, the city unilaterally defined a Midland Urban Growth Area (MUGA), a two-mile territory around the city limits, in an attempt to control urban sprawl. As the county's only capable drinking water supplier, the city would provide water services to communities outside the MUGA such as the nearby village of Sanford. The city would not provide water services within the MUGA without annexation to the city of Midland. This allowed the city to control most of the growth in the county. Since 1991, the policy has since been revised with a series of Urban Cooperation Act Agreements with surrounding townships. Case-by-case redrawings of the MUGA line now allow Midland to sell water to the surrounding townships without annexation.

On May 19, 2020, the Sanford Dam and Edenville Dam both failed, prompting an evacuation of 10,000 Midland residents.  Governor Gretchen Whitmer declared a state of emergency, predicting that parts of Midland and Sandford would be covered in nine feet of water within 12–15 hours. She urged residents to seek shelter with family and friends or at emergency shelters. This major “500 year” flooding event occurred just months after the COVID-19 stay at home order went into effect.

Geography 
While the vast majority of the city exists within Midland County, a small portion of the city extends into Bay County. Most of the city's area is incorporated from Midland Township.

Topography 
Midland is part of the Flint/Tri-Cities.

Climate 
Midland has a humid continental climate (Dfb) with hot, rainy summers with cool nights and cold, snowy winters with average highs around freezing.

Demographics

2010 census
As of the census of 2010, there were 41,863 people, 17,506 households, and 10,766 families residing in the city. The racial makeup of the city was 92.0% White, 2.0% Black, 0.3% Native American, 3.3% Asian, 0.1% Pacific Islander, 0.5% from other races, and 1.8% from two or more races. Hispanic or Latino of any race were 2.4% of the population.

There were 17,506 households, of which 30.4% had children under the age of 18 living with them, 48.1% were married couples living together, 9.8% had a female householder with no husband present, 3.5% had a male householder with no wife present, and 38.5% were non-families. 31.8% of all households were made up of individuals, and 12.8% had someone living alone who was 65 years of age or older. The average household size was 2.33 and the average family size was 2.94.

The median age in the city was 38.3 years. 23.4% of residents were under the age of 18; 11.1% were between the ages of 18 and 24; 23.8% were from 25 to 44; 26.2% were from 45 to 64; and 15.6% were 65 years of age or older. The gender makeup of the city was 48.1% male and 51.9% female.

2000 census
As of the census of 2000, there were 41,685 people, 16,743 households, and 11,000 families residing in the city. The racial makeup of the city was 93.38% White, 1.82% Black, 0.29% Native American, 2.69% Asian, 0.06% Pacific Islander, 0.57% from other races, and 1.19% from two or more races. Hispanic or Latino of any race were 1.92% of the population.

There were 16,743 households, out of which 33.2% had children under the age of 18 living with them, 54.4% were married couples living together, 8.7% had a female householder with no husband present, and 34.3% were non-families. 28.6% of all households were made up of individuals, and 11.4% had someone living alone who was 65 years of age or older. The average household size was 2.42 and the average family size was 3.00.

In the city, the age distribution of the population shows 25.9% under the age of 18, 10.2% from 18 to 24, 27.9% from 25 to 44, 22.2% from 45 to 64, and 13.9% who were 65 years of age or older. The median age was 36 years. For every 100 females, there were 92.0 males. For every 100 females age 18 and over, there were 88.1 males.

The median income for a household in the city was $48,444, and the median income for a family was $64,949. Males had a median income of $53,208 versus $31,098 for females. The per capita income for the city was $26,818. About 5.5% of families and 8.8% of the population were below the poverty line, including 9.5% of those under age 18 and 7.2% of those age 65 or over.

Economy

Retail
The city's major shopping district is located north of town, on Eastman Avenue near US-10. There are several Big-box stores located here, as well as the Midland Mall, which includes Barnes & Noble, Target, GameStop, and Dunhams. Midland also has a downtown on Main Street which includes local restaurants, artist co-ops, and local retail.

Arts and culture

Historical markers
There are four recognized Michigan historical markers in the city.
 John and Almira Kelly House
 Midland County Courthouse
 Origins of Salt Industry / State Salt Well No. 1
 The Upper Bridge

Sites of interest 

Midland has many cultural opportunities in fields ranging from music and theater to science and the arts. The Midland Center for the Arts delivers hands-on exhibits in science, art and technology, at the Alden B. Dow Museum of Science and Art. The Center also provides two state-of-the-art auditoriums for audiences of 400 to 1500 to enjoy everything from the Midland Symphony Orchestra and Center Stage Theatre, to professional programming through MATRIX: Midland.

Midland County Historical Societies Heritage Park provides an opportunity to explore Midland County's history through a variety of avenues. The Herbert D. Doan Midland County History Center houses a research library, gift shop and the interactive Dorothy Dow Arbury Midland County History Gallery, which provides hands on exhibits for exploring Midland County's history. Also located at Heritage Park is the Herbert H. Dow Historical Museum, which explores the history and growth of Dow Chemical Company founded in Midland by Herbert H. Dow. Also located on the campus is the Bradley Home Museum and Carriage House; this 1874 house built by Benjamin F. Bradley allows visitors to see an historic home and furnishings of its time. The Carriage House holds an extensive collection of sleighs and carriages, and it has the largest working blacksmith shop in the Mid-Michigan area.

Seven are classified as Regional Parks, typically larger than 200 acres; seven are considered Community Parks, normally over 15 acres; Neighborhood Parks number 19, usually from five to ten acres in size, located within residential areas; and the 36 Mini-Parks are mostly less than an acre. Other city-owned land includes pathways, undeveloped areas intended for "passive recreation", waterfront areas and protected natural areas.

Skaters of all skill levels use Midland's  Civic Arena, which has two NHL-sized rinks and one Olympic-sized rink. A BMX track is located in Midland's Stratford park. Winner of a 2005 Michigan Cool Cities grant (a grass-roots, volunteer-based training program to revitalize a downtown area), Downtown Midland offers dining, shopping and entertainment for the whole family.

Walkers, joggers, bikers, and skaters can use the Pere Marquette Rail-Trail, a ribbon of asphalt stretching  to the neighboring city of Clare. Midland County's system of natural pathways continues to expand with the recent addition of the Chippewa Trail, which connects to the Pere Marquette trail. The Chippewa Trail ends at the Chippewa Nature Center.

Also in the recreation mix are two golf courses, the Midland Community Center (with multiple swimming pools and exercise facilities), the West Midland Family Center, the North Midland Family Center, the Midland Gymnastics Training Center, the Midland Community Tennis Center and the Midland Curling Center.

Midland's Dow Gardens feature  of flower and vegetable gardens, plus an arboretum. These were the original gardens of the Herbert H. Dow homestead and are open for tours. In addition, the Alden B. Dow Home and Studio offers tours of this landmark American architect's unique and influential style. Alden B. Dow F.A.I.A designed the Grace A. Dow Memorial Library, Midland's public library named in his mother's honor.

Whiting Forest, home to the longest Canopy Walk in the nation, is connected to Dow Gardens with a series of pedestrian bridges and walks. The canopy walk is suspended up to 40 feet above the ground and is 1,400 feet long. Visitors can walk the trails, play in the children's playground and enjoy drinks and snacks in the cafe.

Architecture 
In the early 1930s, Alden B. Dow F.A.I.A. introduced modern design to Midland, Michigan and created over 130 structures during his 50-year career. His innovative and dynamic structures initiated an architectural heritage that is unprecedented in the United States. Dow’s creative concepts inspired dozens of other architects, including Jackson Hallett A.I.A, Glenn Beach A.I.A., Robert Schwartz A.I.A, and Francis “Red” Warner A.I.A. These gifted architects and more, also created beautifully-crafted Mid-Century Modern structures that are an integral part of the over 400 buildings  that dominate Midland.

List of notable places
 Alden B. Dow Home & Studio
 Chippewa Nature Center
 Dahlia Hill
 Dow Chemical Company headquarters
 Dow Corning headquarters
 Dow Corning Midland plant
 Dow Diamond, Home of the Great Lakes Loons, the Single-A Affiliate of the Los Angeles Dodgers of the National League in Major League Baseball
 Dow Gardens
 Grace A. Dow Memorial Library
 Herbert H. Dow House
 Midland Barstow Airport
 Midland Center for the Arts
 Midland Civic Arena, a 1,000-seat indoor arena
 Midland Community Center
 Midland Community Stadium
 Midland Community Tennis Center
 Pere Marquette Rail-Trail
 The Tridge, a three-way pedestrian bridge over the Tittabawassee and Chippewa rivers.
More than 100 places of worship county-wide represent a variety of denominations and architectural styles, earning Midland the nickname "City of Beautiful Churches". Midland's Volunteer Center recruits upwards of 2,000 volunteers each year, and the United Way of Midland County supports 25 community organizations.

Sports
Midland is home to many recreational sporting facilities and organizations. These include the civic ice arena which hosts 2 NHL and one Olympic-sized rinks, a skate park downtown, and the Midland Community Tennis Center and its 32 courts. The tennis center also hosts a USTA Pro Circuit event and was part of the USTA award to Midland as America's Best Tennis Town 2009.

Midland is also host to the following professional sports teams.

Government
Midland uses the council–manager form of government. The council consists of five members elected from geographic wards. Council members serve a two-year term, and the full council is elected during even years. The mayor and the mayor pro tem are chosen from the elected council by a vote of the council, who also appoint the city manager and city attorney, who serve at the pleasure of the council. Federally, Midland is located in Michigan's 8th congressional district, represented by Democrat Dan Kildee.

Education 
Midland Public Schools
Bullock Creek Public Schools
Davenport University
Michigan State University (research facility)
Northwood University
Delta College Midland Center (DCMC)
Ross Medical Education Center
Alternative High Schools
Education and Training Connection (ETC)
Windover High School
Good Shepherd Lutheran School
Calvary Baptist Academy (since 1973)

Media
Midland Community Television Network (Charter Communications Channels 188,189,190,& 191 and AT&T U-Verse Channel 99) is the City of Midland's public, government, and education access cable television channel group. It is the purpose of MCTV to provide the people and organizations in the Midland area with an opportunity to be involved in using the television medium to inform, communicate, educate, and entertain. Midland Community Television Network is a service of the City of Midland serving the residents of the City of Midland and outlying areas through Charter Cable, AT&T U-Verse, and online video-on-demand. MCTV is funded through Video Service Provider franchise fees paid by Charter Communications and AT&T to the City of Midland for use of the public rights-of-way. Franchise fees are a small percentage of the service provider's gross revenue from subscribers within the service area. The MCTV Network is non-commercial and offers video services, training, and multi-media delivery for residents and non-profit organizations within the city or county of Midland. http://cityofmidlandmi.gov/MCTV

Midland is the city of license of two FM radio stations serving the Tri-Cities (Saginaw/Bay City/Midland) area. WKQZ ("Z93") is an active rock station owned by Citadel Broadcasting and broadcasting at 93.3 FM. WUGN is a non-commercial station at 99.7 FM owned by Family Life Communications, broadcasting adult-contemporary Christian music and teaching.

WMPX (1490 AM) is Midland's "hometown" locally owned radio station, owned by Steel Broadcasting and airing an adult standards ("Timeless Classics") format satellite-fed from ABC Radio. WMPX has an FM simulcast station in Beaverton, Michigan, WMRX (97.7 FM), which airs a small amount of local weekend programming separate from the AM. Other area stations include WEJC (88.3 FM) in White Star, Michigan, which airs contemporary Christian music and is affiliated with the Lansing-based "Smile FM" network; WPRJ (101.7 FM) in Coleman, Michigan, a Christian CHR station known as "The Fuse"; and country music station WGDN (103.1 FM) in nearby Gladwin, Michigan.

Midland is also served by radio and television stations from Saginaw, Bay City, Flint, Mount Pleasant, and Houghton Lake.

Midland's main newspaper is the Midland Daily News.

Infrastructure

Transportation
Scheduled airline service is available from MBS International Airport near Freeland and Flint's Bishop International Airport.
The Jack Barstow Municipal Airport, dedicated May 30, 1936, is a general aviation airport operated by the city and available for general aviation aircraft.

There is no regularly scheduled public transportation (bus service). Residents can call in advance to schedule pickup or return transport by one government sponsored agency, "Dial-A-Ride", offering transport within the city only. Then there is "County Connection" a private run public transport for those outside the city of Midland but still within Midland County both for a nominal fee. Both also offer reduced fare rides for elderly and youth.

, a freeway passing the northern edge of Midland, connects with Bay City on the east; Clare and Ludington (as a two-lane highway) to the west.
 is a business loop through the downtown.
 connects Midland with Mount Pleasant and Big Rapids to the west.
 runs northerly from nearby Sanford to West Branch.
 links from US-10 east of the city to Saginaw and MBS International Airport

Power
In 1967, Dow Chemical attained criticality on a 100 kW nuclear research reactor at the Midland facility, primarily as a neutron source and to irradiate samples. The reactor continues to operate.

In 1968, Consumers Power began construction of a nuclear power plant in Midland, primarily for Dow Chemical Company. The project's budget was $257 million, with completion anticipated in 1972. Extreme construction problems caused years of delays and costs soared. The Three Mile Island accident in 1979 resulted in a massive change in nuclear regulatory requirements and system redesign. When it was revealed that the containment buildings were settling and foundation cracks were discovered, Dow canceled their contract with Consumers Power, and the project was abandoned in 1984. The $4.1 billion investment nearly bankrupted Consumers Power. However, in 1985, Consumers Power formed a partnership with eight other companies to convert Midland's abandoned nuclear plant into a gas-fired power plant. Transformation of the plant began in 1986 and was completed at a cost of $500 million. The Midland Cogeneration Venture began producing power in 1991 and that success restored faith in Consumers Power. The facility now produces 10% of the power consumption for the lower peninsula of Michigan.

Notable people 

 Bobby Anderson, NFL player, member of College Football Hall of Fame
 Dick Anderson, safety for undefeated 1972 Miami Dolphins
 Jeff Backus, former offensive tackle for NFL's Detroit Lions
 Mary Brown, Michigan state legislator and educator
 David Lee Camp, former member of United States House of Representatives
 Michael Cohrs, member of Court and Financial Policy Committee Bank of England
 Terry Collins, manager of New York Mets
 Mikey "Bug" Cox, ex-drummer of Coal Chamber
 Alden B. Dow, architect
 Herbert H. Dow, founder of Dow Chemical
 Chris Dowling,Cornerback Midland High School
 Paul Emmel, MLB umpire
 Gary Gerould, sportscaster for NBA's Sacramento Kings
 Cathy Guisewite, cartoonist known for comic strip Cathy
 James Aloysius Hickey, Cardinal Archbishop of Washington, D.C.
 Robert Jarvik, inventor of Jarvik-7 artificial heart
 Larry Jaster, former MLB pitcher with St. Louis Cardinals, Montreal Expos, and Atlanta Braves
 Jim Kern, MLB pitcher, attended high school in Midland
 Nancy LaMott, cabaret singer
 Logan Lynn, musician, composer, singer, producer and LGBT activist
 Kevin Mahar, former MLB player (minor league of the Texas Rangers)
 Andrew Maxwell, football player for Michigan State University
 Meredith McGrath, former Women's Tennis Association professional
 Matt Mieske, former baseball player for five MLB teams
 Chuck Moss, member of Michigan House of Representatives
 Howard Mudd, Pro Bowl offensive guard for San Francisco 49ers, assistant coach for Indianapolis Colts
 Joseph P. Overton, creator of the Overton Window 
 Jalen Parmele, running back for six NFL teams
 Bill Schuette, former Michigan Attorney General, former District Court of Appeals Judge, former member of United States House of Representatives
 Jim Shaw, visual artist
 Steve Shelley, drummer of Sonic Youth
 Mary P. Sinclair, nuclear activist
 Cheryl Studer, opera singer
 Tom Vaughn, jazz pianist and Episcopal priest formerly at St. John's Episcopal Church
 Scott Winchester, former pitcher for Cincinnati Reds
 Roger L. Worsley, educator; reared in Midland; graduated in 1955 from Midland High School
 Andrew Wylie offensive tackle for the Kansas City Chiefs

Sister cities 
 Handa, Aichi, Japan

See also 
Midland Daily News
MBS International Airport, located in nearby Freeland which serves the city

References

External links 

City of Midland web site
Midland Area Chamber of Commerce web site
Midland Tomorrow (economic development corporation)
 

 
Cities in Midland County, Michigan
Cities in Bay County, Michigan
County seats in Michigan
Micropolitan areas of Michigan
1887 establishments in Michigan
Populated places established in 1887